Organic is a live DVD and album by comedian Arj Barker. The DVD was released in November 2018 and the album was released in July 2019.

At the ARIA Music Awards of 2019 it won the ARIA Award for Best Comedy Release.

Track listing 
 "Intro Trump" - 2:01
 "Out of Control Children" - 1:43
 "Uber vs Taxis" - 6:09
 "Shit Sayings" - 3:19
 "Airline Safety" - 3:39
 "Brisvegas" - 3:09
 "King Hit" - 3:39
 "Getting Married" - 3:22
 "Wife's Laugh" - 2:35
 "Gluten Free" - 4:27
 "Caveman & Bread" - 5:35
 "Caveman Sandwich" - 2:46
 "Organic Fruit" - 1:45
 "Spoilers" - 5:36
 "Handwriting & Loveletter" - 5:08
 "Marriage Code" - 5:26
 "The Circus" - 3:44
 "Organic Song Intro" - 1:40
 "Organic" - 7:12

Release history

References 

2019 albums
ARIA Award-winning albums
2010s comedy albums
Stand-up comedy albums
Arj Barker albums